Monkey Business is a 1931 American pre-Code comedy film. It is the third of the Marx Brothers' released movies (Groucho, Harpo, Chico and Zeppo), and the first with an original screenplay rather than an adaptation of one of their Broadway shows. The film also features Thelma Todd, Harry Woods and Ruth Hall. It is directed by Norman Z. McLeod with screenplay by S. J. Perelman and Will B. Johnstone. Much of the story takes place on an ocean liner crossing the Atlantic Ocean.

Plot
On board an ocean liner, four stowaways hide in barrels in the ship's cargo hold. After singing "Sweet Adeline", they are discovered. The naval officers spend the rest of the voyage chasing and attempting to arrest the stowaways. Chico and Harpo disrupt a chess game and confiscate the board, taking it into the stateroom of racketeer Big Joe Helton and his daughter Mary, during a confrontation with rival gangster Alky Briggs. After they scare off Briggs, Big Joe hires Chico and Harpo to be his bodyguards. Groucho dances and romances with Briggs' wife, Lucille, until he is caught and threatened by Briggs. Groucho's audacity convinces Briggs to hire him and Zeppo. Briggs gives them loaded guns, which they immediately ditch in a bucket of water. Groucho offers his services to Big Joe, who says he will think it over.

As the ocean liner is about to dock in the United States, the stowaways realize that to get off the boat, they must steal passports and fool customs officials. Zeppo steals the passport of movie star Maurice Chevalier, and demonstrates his ability to mimic Chevalier's singing. The four butt in line at customs and Zeppo impersonates Chevalier. He is unsuccessful, however, and passes the passport to Chico, Groucho and Harpo, who each attempt unconvincing portrayals of Chevalier singing the same song, with Harpo resorting to a phonograph strapped on his back with an actual record of Chevalier singing. The four escape the authorities after hiding under a covered load of baggage.

Big Joe and his daughter, whom Zeppo met and romanced on board, host a party at which Groucho makes announcements, Chico plays piano and Harpo plays harp. Briggs' men kidnap Big Joe's daughter and take her to an old barn. The former stowaways follow and a fight ensues. The daughter is rescued, and Groucho attempts to find a needle in a haystack.

Except in the credits and in the screenplay, the Marx Brothers' characters have no names in this film. They are referred to simply as "the stowaways".

Cast

Production

Writers S. J. Perelman and Will B. Johnstone were excited to be working with the Marx Brothers. However, producer Herman J. Mankiewicz advised them to lower their expectations. He called the brothers "mercurial, devious, and ungrateful ... I hate to depress you, but you'll rue the day you ever took the assignment. This is an ordeal by fire, make sure you wear asbestos pants."  Of the original script delivered by Perelman and Johnstone, Groucho said, "It stinks." He considered Perelman too intellectual to write for the Marx Brothers manic comic style. The final script was the result of five months of work by the brothers, gag writers, director Norman Z. MacLeod and Mankiewicz.  MacLeod later said that up to 12 writers worked on the film, and that Eddie Cantor contributed when he visited the set during shooting.

Typical for many Marx Brothers films, production censors demanded changes in some lines with sexual innuendo. Monkey Business was banned in Ireland because censors feared it would encourage anarchic tendencies. In Ireland, the film was passed on January 8, 1932, with '16 unspecified cuts to script', including characters falling over each other in a dance scene.

This is the first Marx Brothers film not to feature Margaret Dumont: this time their female foil is comedian Thelma Todd, who would also star in the Marx Brothers' next film, Horse Feathers. In December 1935, Todd was found dead in her car, inside her garage apparently from accidental carbon monoxide poisoning. A line of dialogue in Monkey Business seems to foreshadow Todd's death. Alone with Todd in her cabin, Groucho quips: "You're a woman who's been getting nothing but dirty breaks. Well, we can clean and tighten your brakes, but you'll have to stay in the garage all night."

Early on in Monkey Business, the Brothers—playing stowaways concealed in barrels—harmonize unseen while performing the popular song "Sweet Adeline". It is a matter of debate whether Harpo joins in with the singing. (One of the ship's crew asserts to the captain that he knows there are four stowaways because he can hear them singing "Sweet Adeline".) If so, it would be one of only a few times Harpo used speech on screen, as opposed to other vocalizations such as whistling or sneezing. At least one other possible on-screen utterance occurs in the film A Day at the Races (1937), in which Groucho, Chico, and Harpo are heard singing "Down by the Old Mill Stream" in three-part harmony.

This was the first Marx film to be written specifically for film, and the first shot in Hollywood. Their first two films were filmed at Paramount Pictures' Astoria Studios in Queens, New York City.

The Marx Brothers' real life father (Sam "Frenchie" Marx) is briefly seen in a cameo appearance, sitting on top of luggage behind the Brothers on the pier as they wave to the First Mate upon alighting.  Sam Marx was 72 at the time, and the appearance was his film debut.  He was paid $12.50 each day for two days' work.

Monkey Business was Norman MacLeod's solo directorial debut.

Songs
One of the sequences in this film involves the four brothers attempting to get off the ship using a passport stolen from famous singer (and fellow Paramount star) Maurice Chevalier. Each brother impersonates Chevalier (complete with straw hat) and sings "You Brought a New Kind of Love to Me" ("If the nightingales could sing like you ...") in turn. This poses a problem for the mute Harpo, who mimes to a hidden phonograph tied to his back which plays the Chevalier recording. When the turntable slows down and he has to rewind it, the ruse is uncovered. Earlier, when Zeppo first meets gangster Joe Helton's daughter Mary on the promenade of the ocean liner, "Just One More Chance" by Arthur Johnston and Sam Coslow can be heard playing in the background. Chico performs two pieces on the piano, the "Pizzicato" from Sylvia by Léo Delibes, which then morphs into the song "When I Take My Sugar to Tea", written by Sammy Fain, Irving Kahal, and Pierre Norman. Harpo performs "I'm Daffy over You" by Sol Violinsky and Chico. The dance band at Mary's debut party is playing the song "Ho Hum!" when the Marx Brothers arrive.

Musical numbers
"Sweet Adeline", music by Harry Armstrong, lyrics by Richard Gerard
 "Just One More Chance", by Arthur Johnston and Sam Coslow
"You Brought a New Kind of Love to Me", music and lyrics by Irving Kahal, Pierre Norman and Sammy Fain
"Pizzicato" from Sylvia by Léo Delibes, played on the piano by Chico
"When I Take My Sugar to Tea" by Sammy Fain, Irving Kahal, and Pierre Norman
"O Sole Mio" sung by opera singer Maxine Castle with harp accompaniment by Harpo;  music by Eduardo di Capua, lyrics by Giovanni Capurro
"I'm Daffy Over You" by Chico Marx and Sol Violinsky (Solly Ginsberg)

Reception and impact

Monkey Business was a critical and box office success, and is considered one of the Marx Brothers' best and funniest films.

Contemporary reviews were positive. Mordaunt Hall of The New York Times wrote, "Whether it is really as funny as 'Animal Crackers' is a matter of opinion. Suffice it to say that few persons will be able to go to the Rivoli and keep a straight face." Variety'''s review began, "The usual Marx madhouse and plenty of laughs sprouting from a plot structure resembling one of those California bungalows which sprout up overnight." Film Daily agreed that the plot was "flimsy", but also found the film "crammed all the way with laughs and there's never a dead spot." John Mosher of The New Yorker thought the film was "the best this family has given us."
 
The film was evidently based on two routines the Marx Brothers did during their early days in vaudeville (Home Again and Mr. Green's Reception), along with a story idea from one of Groucho's friends, Bert Granet, called The Seas Are Wet. The passport scene is a reworking of a stage sketch in which the brothers burst into a theatrical agent's office auditioning an impersonation of a current big star. It appeared in their stage shows On the Mezzanine Floor and I'll Say She Is (1924). This skit was also done by the Marxes in the Paramount promotional film The House That Shadows Built (1931).

The concept of the Marx Brothers being stowaways on a ship would be repeated in an episode of their radio series Flywheel, Shyster, and Flywheel (1933) in the episode "The False Roderick", and would also be recycled in their MGM film A Night at the Opera (1935). The essence of Groucho's joke, "Sure, I'm a doctor—where's the horse?" would serve as an integral plot element for their film  A Day at the Races (1937). Also repeated in that later film would be the uproarious medical examination that Harpo and Chico give opera singer Madame Swempski (Cecil Cunningham).

Awards and honors
 2000: AFI's 100 Years...100 Laughs – #73

Sequel
According to Turner Classic Movies' Robert Osborne, a sequel was planned for this film that would continue the gangster theme. During the development of that film, aviator Charles Lindbergh's son was kidnapped and killed by what were believed to be gangsters. The writers quickly shifted gears and instead based the next film, Horse Feathers, very loosely on the Marx Brothers' earlier stage show Fun in Hi Skule''.

See also
List of United States comedy films

References

External links

 
 
 
 
The Marx Brothers Council Podcast discussing "Monkey Business"
 

1931 films
1931 comedy films
American comedy films
American gangster films
American black-and-white films
1930s English-language films
Films directed by Norman Z. McLeod
Marx Brothers (film series)
Paramount Pictures films
Films set on ships
Films produced by Herman J. Mankiewicz
Cultural depictions of Maurice Chevalier
1930s American films